Silent Pal is a 1925 American silent Western film directed by Henry McCarty and starring Thunder the Dog, Eddie Phillips and Shannon Day. Produced by the independent Gotham Pictures, it was designed as a vehicle for Thunder, an Alsatian who featured in several films during the 1920s.

Cast
 Thunder the Dog as The Silent Pal
 Eddie Phillips as David Kingston
 Shannon Day as Marjorie Winters
 Colin Kenny as Randall Phillips
 Willis Marks as Daniel Winters
 Charles W. Mack as Lazarus
 Dorothy Seay as Betty winters

References

Bibliography
 Connelly, Robert B. The Silents: Silent Feature Films, 1910-36, Volume 40, Issue 2. December Press, 1998.
 Munden, Kenneth White. The American Film Institute Catalog of Motion Pictures Produced in the United States, Part 1. University of California Press, 1997.

External links
 

1925 films
1925 Western (genre) films
American silent feature films
Silent American Western (genre) films
Films directed by Henry McCarty
American black-and-white films
Gotham Pictures films
1920s English-language films
1920s American films